Montespertoli is a comune (municipality) in the Metropolitan City of Florence in the Italian region Tuscany, located about  southwest of Florence.

Montespertoli borders the following municipalities: Barberino Val d'Elsa, Castelfiorentino, Certaldo, Empoli, Lastra a Signa, Montelupo Fiorentino, San Casciano in Val di Pesa, Scandicci, Tavarnelle Val di Pesa.

The presence of human settlements in the area dates to Roman and Etruscan times, although the villages of the modern municipality are known from the 11th century, when San Pietro in Mercato and Lucardo are mentioned. In 1393 the borough of Montespertoli was acquired by the Machiavelli family.

Main sights
Pieve (pleban church) of San Pietro in Mercato, consecrated in 1057.
Pieve of Santa Maria a Coeli Aula, known from the 9th century
Church of Sant'Andrea in Montespertoli (16th century), housing 12th century fragments of a baptismal font from Santa Maria a Coeli in Aula, and a Madonna with Saints attributed to Niccolò di Pietro Gerini.
Church of San Michele Arcangelo at Castiglioni (12th century)
Castle of Montegufoni, a former residence of the Acciaioli and later the Sitwell families.
Castle of Sonnino, former residence of the statesman Sidney Sonnino, now a winery.

References

External links
 Official website

Cities and towns in Tuscany